Euryale was a Gorgon in Greek mythology.

Euryale may also refer to:

Greek mythology 
 Euryale, daughter of Minos and possible mother of Orion
 Euryale, one of the Amazons
 Euryale, possible wife of Minyas

Biology 
 Euryale ferox, a species of aquatic plant
Euryale (plant), a genus of aquatic plants
Euryale (echinoderm), a genus of echinoderm

Ships 
French brig Euryale (1863)
USS Euryale (AS-22)

See also 
 Evryali, a piano piece by Iannis Xenakis
List of ships named Euryale
Euryale, list of Greek characters by that name